Ji Guogang (born August 1962) is a former Chinese politician who was vice chairman of the People's Congress of the Tibet Autonomous Region between 2016 and 2022. As of November 2022 he was under investigation by China's top anti-corruption agency. He is the first senior official in Tibet Autonomous Region and the third senior official in China to be targeted by China's top anticorruption watchdog in 2022.

Early life and education
Ji was born in Yanji, Jilin, in August 1962. After resuming the college entrance examination in 1979, he was accepted to Changchun Institute of Geology (now Jilin University), where he majored in regional geological survey and mineral survey. He also received his doctor's degree in economics from Beijing Normal University in 2015.

Political career
After graduating in 1983, Ji was despatched to the State Planning Commission, which was reshuffled as the National Development and Reform Commission in 1998. He joined the Chinese Communist Party (CCP) in December 1984.

In 2012, Ji was transferred to southwest China's Tibet Autonomous Region. In December 2012, he became deputy director of the Development and Reform Commission of the Tibet Autonomous Region, rising to director the next year. He was vice chairman of the People's Congress of the Tibet Autonomous Region in January 2016, in addition to serving as party branch secretary of the Development and Reform Commission of the Tibet Autonomous Region.

Investigation
On 16 November 2022, Ji was put under investigation for alleged "serious violations of discipline and laws" by the Central Commission for Discipline Inspection (CCDI), the party's internal disciplinary body, and the National Supervisory Commission, the highest anti-corruption agency of China.

References

1962 births
Living people
People from Yanbian
Jilin University alumni
Beijing Normal University alumni
People's Republic of China politicians from Jilin
Chinese Communist Party politicians from Jilin